The Suzdal Kremlin (Russian: Суздальский кремль) is the oldest part of the Russian city of Suzdal, dating from the 10th century. Like other Russian Kremlins, it was originally a fortress or citadel and was the religious and administrative center of the city.  It is most notably the site of the Cathedral of the Nativity.

Together with several structures in the neighboring city of Vladimir, it was named a UNESCO World Heritage Site in 1992.

History 
While archeological evidence suggests that the Suzdal Kremlin was settled as early as the 10th century, the fortress itself was built in the late 11th or early 12th century.  The fortress was strategically located on a bend of the Kamenka river on three sides and a moat to the east.  It was surrounded by earthen ramparts that remain to the present day.  A settlement (posad Russian: посад) to the east became home the secular population - shopkeepers and craftsmen, while the Kremlin proper was the home of the prince, the archbishop, and the high clergy.

From the 13th to the 16th centuries, several monasteries and churches were constructed, including the Cathedral of the Nativity, the Convent of the Intercession, and the Monastery of Our Saviour and St. Euthymius.

See also 
 List of castles in Russia
 White Monuments of Vladimir and Suzdal
 Vladimir-Suzdal

Gallery

References 

Kremlins
White Monuments of Vladimir and Suzdal
Buildings and structures in Vladimir Oblast
Tourist attractions in Vladimir Oblast
Vladimir-Suzdal Museum Reserve
Suzdal
Cultural heritage monuments of federal significance in Vladimir Oblast